The Intermountain Intertie is the largest linked amateur radio repeater system in the state of Utah. Managed by the Utah VHF Society, the Intermountain Intertie primarily covers areas west of the Wasatch Front, from Saint George to Tremonton. The Intermountain Intertie also covers areas in the northwest of Utah up to Boise, Idaho and toward the northeast into Evanston, Wyoming and Rock Springs, Wyoming. The Intertie further reaches into parts of Montana, and Arizona. There are no Intermountain Intertie repeaters east of I-15 on I-70; in this area, the Sinbad Desert Amateur Radio Club Intertie has substantial coverage.

The Intermountain Intertie 
The Hidden Peak Repeater, on top of the Snowbird Tram, is the primary hub repeater for the Intermountain Intertie. Linked directly to Hidden Peak is Farnsworth Peak, which connects to southern and western Utah. Also connected to Hidden Peak is Malad Pass, a Simplex Carrier Squealch linking Idaho to the Intertie, Medicine Butte in Evanston, Wyoming connecting Wyoming to the Intertie, and Laketown, Utah connecting Bear Lake to the Intertie. Each of the repeaters connecting to Hidden Peak has repeaters connected to them.

Intertie Linked Repeaters 
Not all Repeaters are connected full time to the Intermountain Intertie. Repeaters outside the state of Utah are connected to the Intermountain Intertie at the discretion of the owners of the out of state Repeaters.

Media and community appearances 
How 1 ham radio guy helped a special kids camp 180 miles away on fire - St. George News
Boy Scouts of America "Operation On Target"

References

Broadcast transmitters